DreamWorks Experience is a themed land at the Dreamworld theme park on the Gold Coast, Queensland, Australia. Themed after DreamWorks Animation and its franchises including Shrek, Madagascar and Kung Fu Panda, it replaced the existing children's area at the park which has previously been themed to Nickelodeon and themed generically. The DreamWorks Experience officially opened on 31 March 2012.

History

The area which DreamWorks Experience currently occupies was originally known as Village Green when it opened in 1983. In 1998, the area was renamed to Village Oval. In 1999, the northern end of Village Oval was redesigned to become Kennyland. In early 2002, Kennyland was removed and most of Village Oval was fenced off. Some of the children's rides were moved to Rivertown to allow for the construction of Nickelodeon Central. During that year the leftover rides were rethemed and relocated to their current positions as part of Nickelodeon Central. Nickelodeon Central opened on 26 December 2002 as the largest children's area in an Australian theme park. In 2008, SpongeBob FlyPants (now Gingy's Glider) opened to expand Nickelodeon Central's offerings.

On 27 April 2010, the Dora the Explorer Seaplanes closed for maintenance and has not operated since. The ride was removed in late 2010 from its position in the park in addition to it being removed from the attraction listing and park map.

Towards the middle of 2011, elements of Nickelodeon theming started to be removed leading to speculation that the contract with the television network was being terminated. By the start of the winter holidays on 25 June 2011, all of the rides were renamed to a generic interim kids theme: Kid's World. In October 2011, the former Nick Pics building and the Remota Boats area were demolished with work beginning on a replacement building on the Nick Pics site.

Earlier in 2011, the outgoing CEO of Dreamworld, Noel Dempsey, leaked Dreamworld's plans to team up with DreamWorks Animation on his LinkedIn profile page. On 10 November 2011, Dreamworld officially announced a three-stage plan to incorporate DreamWorks Animation films and characters into its theme park. The first phase, set to open 19 December 2011, was the DreamWorks Holiday Shrektacular Show which featured 8 DreamWorks Animation characters live on stage. The second phase will include the retheming of Dreamworld's kids area, Kid's World, into a  DreamWorks Experience precinct. This phase is set to open in Easter 2012. The final phase will be the development of an eating and meet-and-greet area called Kung Fu garden. The three phases are expected to cost $10 million to complete.

In late 2011, construction of the DreamWorks Experience precinct began with the removal of the photo shop and the adjacent Remota Boats in Main Street. On 1 February 2012 following the peak season, Dreamworld closed most of the rides in Kid's World. Swinger Zinger, Mighty-Go-Round, Sky Rocket, Rainforest Rampage and Kite Flyer were all closed pending their retheme into DreamWorks Animation. During this time, two temporary rides named Mini-Swingers (SBF Visa Group Circus Swing) and Choppers (SBF Visa Group Chopper Train) operated in Ocean Parade near The Claw and AVPX, respectively. In February 2012, Dreamworld announced that the DreamWorks Experience precinct would originally consist of two areas (Madagascar Madness and Shrek’s Faire Faire Away) with a third area (Kung Fu Panda: Land of Awesomeness) to be added later. Names for the rethemed rides were also announced. On 31 March 2012, the DreamWorks Experience officially opened to the public.

On 15 July 2012, the Avalanche was closed to make way for a new attraction at the end of the year. The replacement attraction will be part of Kung Fu Panda: Land of Awesomeness and its opening will mark the final stage of the DreamWorks Experience.

Attraction history

Madagascar Madness

Escape from Madagascar

Escape from Madagascar is a suspended family roller coaster which opened in 2002 with Nickelodeon Central as Rugrats Runaway Reptar. The roller coaster was the third of its type in the world and the first in the Southern Hemisphere. The ride remains to be Dreamworld's only children's roller coaster. It was renamed to Sky Rocket in 2011 before being renamed Escape from Madagascar in 2012.

King Julien's Theatre in the Wild
King Julien's Theatre in the Wild is a show stage. It runs the Madagascar Live – Prepare to Party Show. The arena opened in 2002 with Nickelodeon Central where it would show: "Slime Time Live", "SpongeBob SquarePants Stories from Bikini Bottom" or "Blue's Clues Live". During the area's time known as Kid's World it showed "The Kenny Koala Show" and "The Goldie Show".

MAD Jungle Jam
MAD Jungle Jam opened with Nickelodeon Central in 2002 as Wild Thornberry's Rainforest Rampage. It is a ball play area which allows kids to fire foam balls throughout the enclosure at targets and each other. It was renamed to Rainforest Rampage in 2011 before being renamed MAD Jungle Jam in 2012. The attraction was manufactured by SCS Interactive.

Madagascar Cargo Hold
Madagascar Cargo Hold is a merchandise shop which sells Madagascar merchandise. It backs onto the Forever After's and was on the site of the former Nick Pics/Fun Snapz photo shop.

Shrek's Faire Faire Away

Forever After's
Forever After's is a merchandise shop which sells Shrek merchandise. It backs onto the Madagascar Cargo Hold and was on the site of the former Nick Pics/Fun Snapz photo shop.

Gingy's Glider
Gingy's Glider is a Zamperla Kite Flyer. It opened in June 2008 as SpongeBob FlyPants. It was the only new attraction to be added to Nickelodeon Central after its initial opening. The ride was originally installed on an empty portion of Kid's World beside the Kid Spot merchandise shop and Bumper Beach. It was renamed to Kite Flyer in 2011 before being renamed Gingy's Glider in 2012. As part of the Kite Flyer's retheme into Gingy's Glider, the ride was relocated to a new location adjacent to the Escape from Madagascar roller coaster.

Puss in Boots Sword Swing
Puss in Boots Sword Swing is a swinger ride based on the character Puss in Boots from the Shrek franchise. The ride has been operating at the park since 1982. It was originally known as Zumer when it was located in Country Fair and Ocean Parade until it was relocated and renamed in 2002 to Swinger Zinger. In 2012, it was renamed and rethemed to Puss in Boots Sword Swing.

Shrek's Ogre-Go-Round
Shrek's Ogre-Go-Round is a carousel. The ride originally opened as the Carousel in 1983 with Village Green. The ride operated for 6 years as part of Nickelodeon Central as the Nick-O-Round (2002–2008) before changing its name to the Backyardigans Mighty-Go-Round in 2008. In 2011, the ride was renamed to Mighty-Go-Round before being renamed Shrek's Ogre-Go-Round in 2012.

Shrek's Treats
Shrek's Treats is a small food outlet located in the centre of the DreamWorks Experience precinct.

Kung Fu Panda: Land of Awesomeness
Kung Fu Panda: Land of Awesomeness opened on 21 December 2012. Before opening, a small Kung Fu Panda-themed area featuring a Po photo opportunity existed and is still a part of the attraction. Additional rides and attractions were introduced which are Pandamonium, Skadoosh and Kung Fu Academy.

Kung Fu Academy
Kung Fu Academy is a small outdoor kids gym area. The area consists of small poles for kids to stretch.

Pandamonium

Pandamonium is the park's eighth thrill ride. It is a Zamperla Air Race replacing the former Avalanche ride. It is also the first thrill ride to be added in the area.

Skadoosh
Skadoosh is a set of bumper cars. The ride opened with the adjacent Game Site as Bumper Bowl before being renamed and rethemed to Rocket Power Bumper Beach from 2002 through to 2011. It was renamed a third time in 2011 to Bumper Beach. It remained under this name until late 2012 when it was closed to become part of Kung Fu Panda: Land of Awesomeness. Throughout its lifetime, the ride's entrance and exit gates have been modified several times although the actual ride has not been moved.

See also
 2011 in amusement parks
 2012 in amusement parks

References

External links
 Madagascar Madness
 Shrek's Faire Faire Away
 Kung Fu Panda: Land Of Awesomeness

Amusement rides introduced in 2012
DreamWorks Animation in amusement parks
Themed areas in Dreamworld (Australia)
Dreamworld (Australia)
2012 establishments in Australia